Joseph Aloysius Wambaugh, Jr. (born January 22, 1937), is a best-selling American writer known for his fictional and nonfictional accounts of police work in the United States.  Several of his early novels were set in Los Angeles and its surroundings and featured Los Angeles police officers as protagonists. He has been nominated for four Edgar Awards (winning three), and was named a Grand Master by the Mystery Writers of America.

Early life
The son of a police officer, Wambaugh was born in East Pittsburgh, Pennsylvania. He joined the U.S. Marine Corps at age 17 and married at 18. Wambaugh is of Irish and German descent.

Police career
Wambaugh received an associate of arts degree from Chaffey College and joined the Los Angeles Police Department (LAPD) in 1960. He served for 14 years, rising from patrolman to detective sergeant. He also attended Cal State Los Angeles, where he earned BA and MA degrees.

Writing career

Themes
Wambaugh's perspective on police work led to his first novel, The New Centurions, which was published early in 1971 to critical acclaim and popular success,  while Wambaugh was still a detective. He later quipped that suspects would ask for his autograph.

Soon turning to writing full time, Wambaugh was prolific and popular starting in the 1970s.  He mixed writing novels (The Blue Knight, The Choirboys, The Black Marble) with nonfiction accounts of crime and detection (true crime): The Onion Field.  His later books included The Glitter Dome (a TV-movie adaptation that starred James Garner and John Lithgow), The Delta Star, and Lines and Shadows.

In contrast to conventionally heroic fictional policemen, Wambaugh brought a gritty texture to his flawed police characters.  Beginning with The Choirboys, Wambaugh changed his approach and began to use dark humor and outrageous incidents to emphasize the psychological peril inherent in modern urban police work.  Many characters are referenced by often unflattering nicknames rather than given names, while other characters are given whimsical names to paint an immediate word portrait for the reader.  Wambaugh became sharply critical of the command structure of the LAPD and individuals within it, and later, of the city government as well. The character Deputy Chief Digby Bates in The Black Marble, for example, is likely a thinly veiled lampoon of Chief Daryl Gates.

Beginning with The Black Marble in 1977, Wambaugh devoted at least half of a narrative to satirical observations of the mores and extravagances of the Southern California "rich and famous" lifestyle. The Black Marble parodied dog shows and the fading lifestyle of "old" Pasadena, but not entirely unsympathetically. The Glitter Dome explored the pornographic film industry, The Delta Star delved into the politics and intrigue of the Nobel Prize and scientific research, and The Secrets of Harry Bright savaged the Palm Springs lifestyle of wealthy people with second homes, inclinations to drugs and drinking, and restricted country clubs. The Secrets... was also a rather grim testimony to how fathers coped with the loss of a child. With The Golden Orange, set in Orange County; Finnegan's Week, set in San Diego; and Floaters, set in San Diego within the events of the America's Cup yacht racing, Wambaugh broadened the scope of his observations.  He was a sharp observer of locations where he lived as a current celebrity himself.

In 1992, Wambaugh generated controversy with his nonfiction book Echoes in the Darkness, based on the murder of Susan Reinert, a teacher in the Upper Merion School District in suburban Philadelphia, Pennsylvania. Critics alleged that the author paid prosecutors in the trial of principal Jay C. Smith to funnel information to him before an arrest was made. Smith's conviction was overturned by the Pennsylvania Supreme Court on the grounds that the prosecution hid the existence of sand that could have supported Smith's case. The chief investigator, John J. Holtz of the Pennsylvania State Police, later admitted having accepted $50,000 from author Wambaugh. Smith sued the police for collusion to falsely convict him, but lost after a federal appeals court concluded that despite his release, evidence of his guilt remained overwhelming. The earlier murder conviction of Smith's alleged co-conspirator, William Bradfield, remained undisturbed. Bradfield died in prison.

One of Wambaugh's most known nonfiction books is The Blooding, which tells the story behind an early landmark case in which DNA fingerprinting helped solve two murders in Leicester, England. The DNA evidence resulted in the arrest and conviction of Colin Pitchfork.

In 2003, Fire Lover: A True Story brought Wambaugh his second Edgar Award, for Best Crime Fact book.  In 2004, he received an MWA Grand Master Award.

In the 2000s, Wambaugh also began teaching screenwriting courses as a guest lecturer for the theater department at the University of California, San Diego.

Hollywood Station series
In 2006, Wambaugh returned to fiction with the publication of Hollywood Station, set in the summer of 2006. It was his first novel since Floaters (1996) – and his first to depict the officers and detectives of LAPD since The Delta Star (1983). Hollywood Station was highly critical of conditions caused by the federal consent decree under which the LAPD had to operate after the Rampart scandal.  In 2008, he followed it with Hollywood Crows, a sequel featuring Hollywood Division Community Relations Officers ("Crows") that featured many of the same characters.  This was followed by Hollywood Moon in 2009, Hollywood Hills in 2010, and Harbor Nocturne in 2012, set in successive calendar years and involving officers of Hollywood Station's midwatch (5:00 pm to 3:00 am).

The only recurring characters to appear in all five books of the series are "Hollywood Nate" Weiss, a cop with dreams of movie stardom; "Flotsam" and "Jetsam", two cops who are avid surfers and always speak in a thick surfer lingo; and "Compassionate Charlie" Gilford, a lazy night-watch detective who functions as a sardonic Greek chorus.

The incidents in which the various police characters are involved are based in part on anecdotes Wambaugh collects from working police officers.

Film and Television adaptations
Many of his books were made into feature films or TV movies during the 1970s and 1980s.  The New Centurions was a theatrical film starring George C. Scott released in 1972. The Blue Knight, a novel following the approaching retirement and last working days of aging veteran beat cop "Bumper" Morgan, was made into an Emmy-winning 1973 TV miniseries starring William Holden.  It was also adapted as a short-lived TV series starring George Kennedy.  Wambaugh made a brief appearance in the pilot as a desk sergeant.   Wambaugh's realistic approach to police drama was highly influential in both film and television depictions (such as Hill Street Blues) from the mid-1970s onward.

Wambaugh was also involved with creating/developing the NBC series Police Story, which ran from 1973 to 1978. The anthology show covered the different aspects of police work (patrol, detective, undercover, etc.) in the LAPD, with story ideas and characters supposedly inspired by off-the-record talks with actual police officers.  At times, the show's characters also dealt with problems not usually seen or associated with typical TV cop shows, such as alcohol abuse, adultery, and brutality.  Wambaugh appeared in his second brief acting role in the second-season episode "Incident in the Kill Zone".  The show had a brief revival on ABC during the 1988–1989 season.

Wambaugh was also involved in the production of the film versions of The Onion Field (1979) and The Black Marble (1980), both directed by Harold Becker.  In 1981, he won an Edgar Award from the Mystery Writers of America for his screenplay for the latter film.  The Choirboys film adaptation had met with poor critical and audience reception a few years earlier. All three films featured performances by then up-and-coming actor James Woods.

The Glitter Dome, which starred James Garner, John Lithgow and Margot Kidder, was a 1984 film for HBO.

Fugitive Nights was made into a 1993 feature film of the same title.

Works

Novels
 The New Centurions (1971)
 The Blue Knight (1972)
 The Choirboys (1975)
 The Black Marble (1978)
 The Glitter Dome (1981)
 The Delta Star (1983)
 The Secrets of Harry Bright (1985)
 The Golden Orange (1990)
 Fugitive Nights: Danger in the Desert (1992)
 Finnegan's Week (1993)
 Floaters (1996)
 Hollywood Station (2006)
 Hollywood Crows (2008)
 Hollywood Moon (2009)
 Hollywood Hills (2010)
 Harbor Nocturne (2012)

Non-fiction
 The Onion Field (1973)
 Lines and Shadows (1984)
 Echoes in the Darkness (1987)
 The Blooding: The True Story of the Narborough Village Murders (1989)
 Also, Fugitive Nights was translated and published in:
 Chinese as Ye mu mi zong (1993). Taipei: Shi jie guan. pp. 320. . 
 Russian as Nochi beglet︠s︡a: roman (1993). Moskva: Tekst. pp. 333. . 
 Spanish as La Noche del Fugitivo, with Ramón Alonso (1992). Barcelona: Grijalbo. pp. 444. . 
 Fire Lover: A True Story (2002)
}}

References

Further reading
 Marling, William. Hard-Boiled Fiction, Case Western Reserve University. Marling page
 WAMBAUGH, Joseph, International Who's Who.

External links
 Official Joseph Wambaugh website
 Hollywood Station Reviews at Metacritic

1937 births
Living people
20th-century American male writers
21st-century American male writers
20th-century American non-fiction writers
21st-century American non-fiction writers
20th-century American novelists
21st-century American novelists
American crime fiction writers
American male novelists
American non-fiction crime writers
American people of German descent
American people of Irish descent
California State University, Los Angeles alumni
Edgar Award winners
Los Angeles Police Department officers
Novelists from California
Novelists from Pennsylvania
People from East Pittsburgh, Pennsylvania
People from Rancho Mirage, California
United States Marines
Writers from Los Angeles